was a Japanese character actor and narrator. He is known for his work with Japanese New Wave director Nagisa Oshima, and for several films with Kaneto Shindo, such as Onibaba and Kuroneko. He won the best actor award from Kinema Junpo for the films The Ceremony and Nihon no akuryō. He also worked as a narrator for many documentaries, both on television and film.

In his early days as an actor, before his success in The Human Condition, he supported himself by producing gariban hand-written mimeographs, and he maintained his interest in hand-printing to the end of his life.

In 1981 he appeared in the film Daydream performing an unsimulated sex scene with actress Kyoko Aizome. The involvement of a mainstream actor in a hardcore film made good press coverage and brought audiences to the theater "in droves".

Filmography

Films

Television

References

External links
 
 JMDB

Japanese male actors
1928 births
2010 deaths
Actors from Fukushima Prefecture
People from Aizu